El Debate was a conservative political newspaper published in Paraguay. It was founded by Luis Ruffinelli in 1937.

References

Newspapers published in Paraguay
1937 establishments in Paraguay
Newspapers established in 1937